The 2015 UCI BMX World Championships were the twentieth edition of the UCI BMX World Championships, which took place in Heusden-Zolder, Belgium, and crowned world champions in the cycling discipline of BMX.

Medal summary

Elite events

Junior events

Medal table

References

External links
Official event website

 
UCI BMX World Championships
UCI BMX World Championships
Circuit Zolder
International cycle races hosted by Belgium
2015 in Belgian sport
Heusden-Zolder